Howard Hunter may refer to:

Howard J. Hunter Jr. (1946–2007), member of the United States House of Representatives
Howard J. Hunter III, member of the North Carolina General Assembly
Howard W. Hunter (1907–1995), fourteenth president of The Church of Jesus Christ of Latter-day Saints

Lt. Howard Hunter,   character in Hill Street Blues
Howard Hunter, law professor and president  of Singapore Management University, 2004–2010